The Belgian railway line 50A is a railway line in Belgium connecting Brussels with Ostend through Ghent and Bruges. The section between Ghent and Ostend was completed in 1838. The section between Ghent and Brussels was opened between 1923 and 1933, offering a faster connection than the existing line 50. The total length of the line is 114.3 km.

Stations
The main interchange stations on line 50A are:

Brussels-South: to Antwerp, Liège, Namur, Charleroi and Mons 
Gent-Sint-Pieters: to Antwerp, Kortrijk and Oudenaarde
Bruges: to Kortrijk, Zeebrugge, Blankenberge and Knokke

References

50A
Railway lines opened in 1838